Epipagis peritalis is a moth in the family Crambidae found in Sri Lanka.

References

Moths described in 1859
Spilomelinae